Le Chat ("The Cat") is a 1971 French-language drama film directed by Pierre Granier-Deferre and based on Georges Simenon's 1967 novel The Cat. It recounts the story of an elderly married couple, Julien Bouin, a former typographist, and his wife Clemence, who used to perform in a circus, who have been loathing each other for years. They hardly talk to each other in their small house, soon to be demolished. Their only form of communication being occasional notes on scraps of paper. A stray cat being the only one he still gives affection to, the cat becomes the object of Clemence's anger. However, they are soon to understand that they cannot live without each other. The storyline of The Cat is speculated to have originated from Georges Simenon's difficult relationship with his mother.

Cast
 Jean Gabin as Julien Bouin
 Simone Signoret as Clémence Bouin
 Annie Cordy as Nelly, owner of a Florida hotel
 Jacques Rispal as Le docteur / Doctor
 Nicole Desailly as L'infirmière / Nurse
 Harry-Max as Le retraité / Retiree
 André Rouyer as Le délégué / Delegate
 Carlo Nell as L'agent immobilier / Real-estate agent
 Yves Barsacq as L'architecte / Architect
 Florence Haguenauer as Germaine
 Renate Birgo as La crémière / Dairywoman
 Ermanno Casanova as Le patron du café / Café owner (as Ermano Casanova)
 Georges Mansart as Le garçon à la moto / Boy on a motorcycle
 Isabel del Río as La fille à la moto / Girl on a motorcycle

Awards
 21st Berlin International Film Festival
 Silver Bear for Best Actress (Simone Signoret - won)
 Silver Bear for Best Actor (Jean Gabin - won)
 Golden Bear (nominated)

References

External links

1971 films
1971 drama films
French drama films
Italian drama films
Films directed by Pierre Granier-Deferre
Films scored by Philippe Sarde
Films based on works by Georges Simenon
Films based on Belgian novels
Films about old age
Films about suicide
1970s French-language films
1970s French films
1970s Italian films